Direct Action and Democracy Today is a 2005 book by April Carter.  In the book, Carter debates the nature and meaning of social and political protest and discusses the relationship between direct action and people's claims for greater democratic control, not only against repressive regimes but also in liberal parliamentary states.

Carter is clearly supportive of direct action, but her analysis is based on logic and evidence rather than advocacy. Her assessments suggest that theorists have not been paying enough attention to the challenge posed by direct action, a challenge to both systems of power and the ideas that legitimate them.

References

2005 non-fiction books
Activism
Community organizing
Democracy
Polity (publisher) books